Gladys Clarke  (15 February 1923 in West Bromwich – 10 June 2013) was a British javelin thrower who competed in the 1948 Summer Olympics.

References

1923 births
2013 deaths
Athletes (track and field) at the 1948 Summer Olympics
British female javelin throwers
Olympic athletes of Great Britain
Sportspeople from West Bromwich